Penny Market XXL was a discount Romanian supermarket chain owned by Rewe Group, which also operated the Billa, Penny Market and Selgros in Romania. As opposed to Billa, XXL stores were generally larger and geared towards low-income and middle-income consumers. The XXL stores were rebranded as Penny stores or were closed.

See also
 REWE Group
 Billa
 Penny Market 
 Selgros

External links
 Penny Market XXL

Supermarkets of Romania